Marchantiaceae is a family of liverworts in order Marchantiales. It contains a single genus Marchantia.

Genera in Marchantiaceae 
Until recently, three genera were included in the Marchantiaceae:
 Bucegia Radian 1903
 Marchantia Linnaeus 1753
 Preissia Corda 1829 non Opiz 1852

However, the genera Bucegia and Preissia have since been merged into Marchantia, leaving only the single genus in the family.

A number of additional genera have been moved to other families:
 Asterella, now in family Aytoniaceae 
 Conocephalum, now in family Conocephalaceae 
 Dumortiera, now in family Dumortieraceae 
 Lunularia, now in family Lunulariaceae 
 Reboulia, now in family Aytoniaceae
 Neohodgsonia, now in family Neohodgsoniaceae

References

External links 
  Family information

Marchantiales
Liverwort families
Monogeneric plant families